Keny (Russian:  Кены) is a draughts game played in the Caucasus and nearby areas of Turkey.  Keny is actually the Ossetian name for the game as it is most popular in Ossetia, a region in the Caucasus.  In Armenia, it is called Vayut tama (Russian:  вают тама).  The game is also known as Caucasian checkers (Russian:  кавказские шашки). There may be slight variations of the game, but the rules described here are from Nikita Sokolov (Никита Соколов) from his article "A long time ago, we did not take checkers into our hands ..." ("Давненько не брали мы в руки шашек...") (2005).

Rules 
The game resembles both Turkish and Armenian draughts in that all these games use an 8 x 8 uncheckered square board, have 16 men or checkers (an unpromoted man is called a "ken", or Russian:  кен) initially placed in each player's second and third ranks, and allow for men and kings to move orthogonally (a king is called a "pepper", or Russian:  перцем). It resembles Turkish draughts more in that the ken can only move forward or sideways (left or right) onto an orthogonally adjacent vacant square until it is promoted to king in which case it can also move backwards, and in addition move any number of unoccupied squares in all four orthogonal directions.

A ken can capture an orthogonally adjacent enemy piece using the short leap method as in draughts whereby the ken leaps over the orthogonally adjacent enemy piece and lands on an unoccupied square immediately behind it, but unlike both Turkish draughts and Armenian draughts, a ken can capture an orthogonally adjacent enemy piece backward.  As in Turkish and Armenian draughts, multiple enemy pieces can be captured in a single turn, captures are mandatory, and a ken promotes to pepper upon reaching the other player's first rank.  The pepper is the equivalent of the flying king in Turkish and Armenian draughts in that it can capture an enemy piece from any orthogonal direction as long as there is no obstruction between the pepper and the enemy piece and any obstruction between the enemy piece and where the pepper is to land.

A ken can leap over an orthogonally adjacent friendly ken and land on an unoccupied square immediately beyond it, and this is similar to the short leap in draughts except that the friendly ken is not captured. This type of movement is unusual in draughts and allows for pieces to move quicker.

As in most draughts games, the objective is to capture all of your opponent's pieces or block them thus preventing them from performing a legal move.  If anytime during the game, no captures are committed in 10 successive turns, then the game is deemed a draw.

See also 

 Draughts
 Turkish Draughts
 Armenian Draughts
Dameo
Tobit
 Ossetia

Notes

References 

Draughts variants
Draughts
Abstract strategy games
Ossetia